2011-12 in Russian football.

2011–12 Russian Premier League

First phase

Championship group table

Relegation group table

2011–12 Russian Football National League

First phase

2011–12 Russian Second Division

2011–12 Russian Cup

2011 Russian Super Cup

Europe 2010–11

UEFA Champions League

Zenit Saint Petersburg

Rubin Kazan

Spartak Moscow

UEFA Europa League

Rubin Kazan

CSKA Moscow

Zenit Saint Petersburg

Spartak Moscow

Europe 2011–12

UEFA Champions League

Rubin Kazan

Zenit St. Petersburg

CSKA Moscow

UEFA Europa League

Rubin Kazan

Lokomotiv Moscow

 
Seasons in Russian football